Camara De Diputados Televisión or CDtv is a public owned cable TV channel in Chile. 

CDtv broadcasts the sessions of the Chamber of Deputies of Chile live.

See also 
 List of Chilean television channels

External links
  

Television networks in Chile
Legislature broadcasters
Television stations in Chile
Spanish-language television stations